Colas may refer to:

 People
Claudius Colas (1884–1914), French Esperantist
Emily Colas, American author
Fabrice Colas (born 1964), French track cyclist
Henry Colas (disambiguation), name of multiple people
Oscar Colas, Cuban baseball player
Paul Colas (1880–1972), French sports shooter

Business and organisations
Colas Group, a multi-national civil engineering company based in France
Colas Rail, its rail freight subsidiary

See also
Cola